Operation Tidal Wave was an air attack by bombers of the United States Army Air Forces (USAAF) based in Libya on nine oil refineries around Ploiești, Romania on 1 August 1943, during World War II. It was a strategic bombing mission and part of the "oil campaign" to deny petroleum-based fuel to the Axis powers. The mission resulted in "no curtailment of overall product output".

This operation was one of the costliest for the USAAF in the European Theater, with 53 aircraft and 660 air crewmen lost. It was proportionally the most costly major Allied air raid of the war, and its date was later referred to as "Black Sunday". Five Medals of Honor and 56 Distinguished Service Crosses along with numerous others awards went to Operation Tidal Wave crew members. A 1999 research report prepared for the Air War College at Maxwell Air Force Base in Alabama concluded that the bombing campaign in Ploiești was "one of the bloodiest and most heroic missions of all time". One of the downed American planes crashed into a female prison in Ploiești, resulting in the death of 100 civilians and the injury of another 200.

Preparations
Romania had been a major power in the oil industry since the 1800s. It was one of the largest producers in Europe and Ploiești was a major part of that production. The Ploiești oil refineries provided about 30% of all Axis oil production.

Axis air defenses
In June 1942, 13 B-24 Liberators of the "Halverson project" (HALPRO) attacked Ploiești. Though damage was small, Germany and Romania responded by putting strong anti-aircraft defenses around Ploiești. Luftwaffe General Alfred Gerstenberg built one of the heaviest and best-integrated air defense networks in Europe. The defenses included several hundred large-caliber 88mm guns and 10.5 cm FlaK 38 anti-aircraft guns, and many more small-caliber guns. The latter were concealed in haystacks, railroad cars, and mock buildings. German and Romanian AA artillery at Ploiești consisted of 52 heavy (88 mm), 9 medium (37 mm), and 17 light (20 mm) anti-aircraft batteries.

The defenses were divided between the German 5th Flak Division (30 heavy, 5 medium, and 7 light batteries) and the Romanian 4th AA Brigade (22 heavy, 2 medium, and 10 light batteries). Half of the manpower of the German 5th Flak Division was Romanian. The Axis had 52 fighters within flight range of Ploiești (Bf 109 fighters and Bf 110 night fighters, plus assorted types of Romanian IAR 80 fighters). For the defense of Ploiești, the Royal Romanian Air Force had aircraft from five Escadrile (Squadrons): 61 (IAR 80A), 62 (IAR 80B), 45 (IAR 80C), 53 (Bf 109G) and 68 (Bf 110). These defenses made Ploiești the third or fourth most heavily defended target in Axis Europe, after Berlin and Vienna or the Ruhr, and thus the most heavily defended Axis target outside the Third Reich.

Mission plan

The Ninth Air Force (98th and 376th Bombardment Groups) was responsible for the overall conduct of the raid, and the partially formed Eighth Air Force provided three additional bomb groups (44th, 93rd, and 389th). All the bombers employed were B-24 Liberators.

Colonel Jacob E. Smart planned the operation, based on HALPRO's experiences. HALPRO had encountered minimal air defenses in its raid, so the planners decided Tidal Wave would be executed by day, and that the attacking bombers would approach at low altitude to avoid detection by German radar. Training included extensive review of detailed sand table models, practice raids over a mock-up of the target in the Libyan desert and practical exercises over a number of secondary targets in July to prove the viability of such a low-level strike. The bombers to be used were re-equipped with bomb-bay fuel tanks to increase their fuel capacity to 3,100 gallons.

The operation was to consist of 178 bombers with a total of 1,751 aircrew, one of the largest commitments of American heavy bombers and crewmen up to that time. The planes were to fly from airfields near Benghazi, Libya. They were to cross the Mediterranean and the Adriatic Sea, pass near the island of Corfu, cross over the Pindus Mountains in Albania, cross southern Yugoslavia, enter southwestern Romania, and turn east toward Ploiești. Reaching Ploiești, they were to locate pre-determined checkpoints, approach their targets from the north, and strike all targets simultaneously.

For political reasons, the Allied planners decided to avoid the city of Ploiești, so that it would not be bombed by accident.

Flight to Romania

 On the morning of 1 August 1943, the five groups comprising the strike force began lifting off from their home air fields around Benghazi. Large amounts of dust kicked up during take-off caused limited visibility and strained engines already carrying the burden of large bomb loads and additional fuel. These conditions contributed to the loss of one aircraft during take-off, but 177 of the planned 178 aircraft departed safely.

The formation reached the Adriatic Sea without further incident; however aircraft #28, Wongo Wongo, belonging to the 376th Bombardment Group (the lead group, about 40 B-24s) and piloted by Lt. Brian Flavelle began to fly erratically before plunging into the sea due to unknown causes. Lt. Guy Iovinea personal friend of Flavelle and piloting aircraft #23 Desert Lillydescended from the formation in order to look for survivors, narrowly missing aircraft Brewery Wagon piloted by Lt. John Palm. No survivors were seen, and due to the additional weight of fuel, Iovine was unable to regain altitude to rejoin the formation and resume course to Ploiești.

The resulting confusion was compounded by the inability to regain cohesion due to orders to maintain strict radio silence. Ten other aircrews returned to friendly air fields after the incident, and the remaining aircraft faced the  climb over the Pindus mountains, which were shrouded in cloud cover.

Mission leaders deemed these concerns to be less important than maintaining security through radio silence. The American leaders were unaware that the Germans knew of their presence, though not of their target. Although the Americans' orders would have allowed them to break radio silence to rebuild their formations, the strike proceeded without correction, and this proved costly.

Although now well strung out on approach to Pitești, all five groups made the navigational check point  from Ploiești. At Câmpina, the 389th Bomb Group departed as planned for its separate, synchronized approach to the mission target. Continuing from Pitești, Col. Keith K. Compton and Gen. Ent made a costly navigational error. At Târgoviște, halfway to the next check point at Florești, Compton followed the incorrect railway line for his turn toward Ploiești, setting his group and Lt. Col. Addison Baker's 93rd Bomb Group on a course for Bucharest. In the process, Ent and Compton went against the advice of their airplane's navigator and the Halverson Project (HALPRO) veteran Cpt. Harold Wicklund. Now facing disaster, many crews chose to break radio silence and draw attention to the navigational error. Meanwhile, both groups had to face Gerstenberg's extensive air defenses around the Bucharest area in addition to those awaiting them around Ploiești.

Attacks

The Hell's Wench aircraft flown by Lt. Col. Baker and his co-pilot Maj. John L. Jerstad, who had already flown a full tour of duty while stationed in England, was now hit by flak. They jettisoned their bombs to maintain the lead position of the formation over their target at the Columbia Aquila refinery. Despite heavy losses by the 93rd, Baker and Jerstad maintained course and, once clear, began to climb away. Realizing the aircraft was no longer controllable, they kept climbing to let their crew abandon the aircraft. Although none survived, Baker and Jerstad were posthumously awarded the Medal of Honor for these actions.

Maj. Ramsay D. Potts flying The Duchess and Maj. George S. Brown aboard Queenie, encountering heavy smoke over Columbia Aquila, led additional aircraft of the 93rd and successfully dropped their bombs over the Astra Romana, Unirea Orion, and Columbia Aquila refineries. In all, the 93rd lost 11 aircraft over their targets in Ploiești. One of the bombers, Jose Carioca, was shot down by a Romanian IAR 80 fighter, which went into a half roll and moved swiftly under the B-24 upside down, raking its belly with bullets. The bomber crashed into Ploiești Women's Prison. Of the 100 civilians killed and 200 injured in this raid, about half occurred when this three-story building exploded in flames. Forty women survived, but there were no survivors from Jose Carioca's crew.

Concordia Vega and first Steaua Română attacks
Air defenses were heavy over the 376th's target (Romana Americana), and Gen. Ent instructed Compton to attack "targets of opportunity." Most of the 376th B-24s bombed the Steaua Română refinery at Câmpina from the east, and five headed directly into the already smoldering conflagration over the Concordia Vega refinery. At Câmpina, air defenses on overlooking hills were able to fire down into the formation.

Astra Română and Columbia Aquila attacks

With the 93rd and 376th engaged over the target area, Col. John R. Kane of the 98th Bomb Group and Col. Leon W. Johnson of the 44th Bomb Group made their prescribed turn at Floresti and proceeded to their respective targets at the Astra Romana and Columbia Aquila refineries. Both groups would find German and Romanian defenses on full alert and faced the full effects of now raging oil fires, heavy smoke, secondary explosions, and delayed-fuse bombs dropped by Baker's 93rd Bomb Group on their earlier run. Both Kane and Johnson's approach, parallel to the Florești-to-Ploiești railway had the unfortunate distinction of encountering Gerstenberg's disguised flak train. The advantage, however, would rest with the 98th and 44th, whose gunners quickly responded to the threat, disabling the locomotive and killing multiple air defense crews.

With the effects of the 93rd and 376th's runs causing difficulties locating and bombing their primary targets, both Kane and Johnson did not deviate from their intended targets, taking heavy losses in the process. Their low approach even enabled gunners to engage in continued ground suppression of air defense crews from directly above their targets. For their leadership and heroism, both were awarded the Medal of Honor. Lt. Col. James T. Posey took 21 of the 44th's aircraft on a separate assigned attack run on the Creditul Minier refinery just south of Ploiești. Although air defense batteries had already heavily engaged the 93rd, Posey was fully received by the same emplacements. Maintaining a continued low-level approach into the target area took some of the still heavily laden aircraft through tall grass and damage was caused by low-level obstructions. Posey and his aircraftequipped with heavier  bombsmanaged to successfully find their marks at Creditul Minier, without loss to the formation.

Second Steaua Română attack
The last Tidal Wave attack bombed the Steaua Română refinery ( northwest of Ploiești)at Câmpina. The 389th attack led by Col. Jack Wood was as rehearsed at Benghazi. The damage caused by the 376th and 389th attacks heavily damaged the refinery, which did not resume production for the duration of the war. The 389th lost four aircraft over the target area, including B-24 Ole Kickapoo flown by 2nd Lt. Lloyd Herbert Hughes. After hits to Ole Kickapoo only 30 feet over the target area, the detonation of previously dropped bombs had ignited fuel leaking from the B-24. Hughes maintained course for bombardier 2nd Lt. John A. McLoughlin to bomb, and the B-24 subsequently crash-landed, in an explosive cart-wheel, in a river bed. Hughes (who posthumously received the Medal of Honor) and five crew members were killed, four survived the crash but died of injuries, and two gunners became prisoners of war.

Bulgarian Air Force 
On their way over Bulgaria, the B-24s were intercepted by three fighter groups, 10 Bf 109s from Karlovo, four Avia B-534s from Bozhurishte, and 10 Avia B-534s from Vrashdebna (Sofia airport). The pilots, Sublieutenant Peter Bochev (five victories), Captain Tschudomir Toplodolski (four victories), Lieutenant Stoyan Stoyanov (five victories), and Sublieutenant Hristo Krastev (one victory) gained their first kills for the Bulgarian Air Force of the war. The new fighter aces were decorated afterwards by Tsar Boris III of Bulgaria personally with the Order of Bravery, the first time in 25 years. Iron Crosses were awarded a month later from the German embassy.

Result
Only 88 B-24s returned to Libya, of which 55 had battle damage. Losses included 44 to air defenses and additional B-24s that ditched in the Mediterranean or were interned after landing in neutral Turkey. Some were diverted to the RAF airfield on Cyprus. One B-24 with 365 bullet holes in it landed in Libya 14 hours after departing; its survival was due to the light armament of the Bulgarian Avia B-534 (only four rifle-caliber (7.92 mm) machine guns).

For the Americans, 310 air crewmen were killed or missing, 108 were captured by the Axis, 78 were interned in Turkey, and four were taken in by Tito's partisans in Yugoslavia. Three of the five Medals of Honor (the most for any single air action in history) were awarded posthumously. The Allies estimated a loss of 40% of the refining capacity at the Ploiești refineries, although some refineries were largely untouched.  Most of the damage was repaired within weeks, after which the net output of fuel was greater than before the raid. Circa September, the Enemy Oil Committee appraisal of Ploiești bomb damage indicated "...no curtailment of overall product output..." because many of the refineries had been operating previously below maximum capacity.

The Royal Romanian Air Force carried out 59 sorties during Tidal Wave, and the Luftwaffe 89. The Americans lost 53 Liberators (including 8 which landed in Turkey and were interned) and 55 more were damaged. The Romanians claimed 20 confirmed or probable air victories for the loss of one IAR 80B and one Bf 110, plus 15 more claimed by Romanian AA guns. Even if optimistic, the Romanian claims compared favorably with the American seven-fold plus exaggerations, during Tidal Wave and subsequent raids. The system of air victory confirmations of the Royal Romanian Air Force was stricter than that of the Luftwaffe at the time of the raid. Luftwaffe losses amounted to five aircraft. The American Ninth Air Force was expelled from the theatre.

Through emergency bomb drops on secondary targets, there were casualties at Drenta, Elena, Byala, Ruse, Boychinovtsi, Veliko Tarnovo, Plovdiv, Lom, and Oak-Tulovo.

Given the large and unbalanced loss of aircraft and the limited damage to the targets, Operation Tidal Wave is considered a strategic failure by the Allies.

Aftermath
Several air attacks on Romanian territory were carried out by the Western Allies. Until August 1944, the Royal Romanian Air Force and Romanian flak shot down 223 American and British bombers as well as 36 fighters. Romanian losses amounted to 80 aircraft. Luftwaffe pilots shot down 66 more Western Allied aircraft. Total Western Allied casualties amounted to 1,706 killed and 1,123 captured.

Ninth Air Force and Eighth Air Force order of battle
 Ninth Air Force
 98th Bombardment Group (Heavy) ("Pyramiders"), Col. John R. Kane°
 376th Bombardment Group (Heavy) ("Liberandos"), Col. Keith K. Compton°°
 Eighth Air Force
 44th Bombardment Group (Heavy) ("Flying Eight Balls"), Col. Leon W. Johnson°
 93rd Bombardment Group (Heavy) ("Ted Timberlake's Travelling Circus"), Lt.Col. Addison E. Baker°, Maj. John L. Jerstad°
 389th Bombardment Group (Heavy) ("Sky Scorpions"), Col. Jack W. Wood°°, 2nd Lt. Lloyd Herbert Hughes°

°Awarded Medal of Honor
°°Awarded Distinguished Service Cross

See also

 Bombing of Romania in World War II
 Operation Tidal Wave II, a US-led military operation against Islamic State's oil infrastructure named after the failed WW2 operation.

References

External link

1943 in Europe
Military operations of World War II
World War II aerial operations and battles of the Eastern Front
Aerial operations and battles of World War II
Aerial operations and battles of World War II involving Germany
Aerial operations and battles of World War II involving the United States
Battles and operations of World War II involving Bulgaria
Battles and operations of World War II involving Romania
Military history of Romania during World War II
Oil campaign of World War II
Ploiești
Romania–United States military relations
Germany–United States military relations
Bulgaria–United States military relations